José Eduardo Martinho Garcia Leandro (born 1939) is a Portuguese lieutenant-general and former colonial administrator. he is currently a member of the General Council of Universidade Aberta, professor at the Institute of Political Studies at the Catholic University of Portugal, curator and administrator of the Jorge Álvares Foundation and corresponding academic at the International Academy of Portuguese Culture.

Biography
Leandro began his military career at the Colégio Militar in 1950. He joined the Military Academy in 1957, where he completed the Artillery course in 1960. Later, he had mobilized for various service commissions in Angola, Guinea, Timor and Macau.

He served as chief of staff of Governor of Timor from 1968 to 1970. On 19 November 1974, he was appointed the Governor of Macau, replacing José Manuel de Sousa e Faro Nobre de Carvalho. During his tenure, he drew up the Estatuto Orgânico de Macau, an organic law which was later approved by Portuguese legislation on 17 February 1976, reclassified Macau as a "Chinese territory under Portuguese administration" (território chinês sob administração portuguesa). He left office on 27 November 1979.

Works
Timor: um país para o século XXI
Macau nos Anos da Revolução Portuguesa 1974-1979

Honours
  Grand Cross of Order of Prince Henry (13 January 1981)
  Knight of Military Order of Aviz (14 July 1983)
  Commander of Military Order of Aviz (10 June 1992)

References

1939 births
Living people
People from Luanda
Portuguese generals
Governors of Macau
Portuguese colonial governors and administrators
Colonial people in Angola
Grand Crosses of the Order of Prince Henry
Knights of the Order of Aviz
Commanders of the Order of Aviz